The Communauté de communes des Campagnes de l'Artois is a communauté de communes, an intercommunal structure, in the Pas-de-Calais department, in the Hauts-de-France region, northern France. It was created in January 2017 by the merger of the former communautés de communes L'Atrébatie, La Porte des Vallées and Les Deux Sources. Its area is 553.8 km2, and its population was 33,193 in 2018. Its seat is in Avesnes-le-Comte.

Composition
The communauté de communes consists of the following 96 communes:

Adinfer
Agnez-lès-Duisans
Agnières
Ambrines
Amplier
Aubigny-en-Artois
Avesnes-le-Comte
Bailleul-aux-Cornailles
Bailleulmont
Bailleulval
Barly
Bavincourt
Beaudricourt
Beaufort-Blavincourt
Berlencourt-le-Cauroy
Berles-au-Bois
Berles-Monchel
Berneville
Béthonsart
Bienvillers-au-Bois
Blairville
Camblain-l'Abbé
Cambligneul
Canettemont
Capelle-Fermont
La Cauchie
Chelers
Couin
Coullemont
Couturelle
Denier
Duisans
Estrée-Wamin
Famechon
Fosseux
Frévillers
Frévin-Capelle
Gaudiempré
Givenchy-le-Noble
Gouves
Gouy-en-Artois
Grand-Rullecourt
Grincourt-lès-Pas
Habarcq
Halloy
Hannescamps
Haute-Avesnes
Hauteville
Hendecourt-lès-Ransart
Hénu
La Herlière
Hermaville
Houvin-Houvigneul
Humbercamps
Ivergny
Izel-lès-Hameau
Lattre-Saint-Quentin
Liencourt
Lignereuil
Magnicourt-en-Comte
Magnicourt-sur-Canche
Maizières
Manin
Mingoval
Monchiet
Monchy-au-Bois
Mondicourt
Montenescourt
Noyellette
Noyelle-Vion
Orville
Pas-en-Artois
Penin
Pommera
Pommier
Rebreuve-sur-Canche
Rebreuviette
Saint-Amand
Sars-le-Bois
Sarton
Saulty
Savy-Berlette
Simencourt
Sombrin
Le Souich
Sus-Saint-Léger
Thièvres
Tilloy-lès-Hermaville
Tincques
Villers-Brûlin
Villers-Châtel
Villers-Sir-Simon
Wanquetin
Warlincourt-lès-Pas
Warlus
Warluzel

References

Commune communities in France
Intercommunalities of Pas-de-Calais